Anne Bishop is an American fantasy writer. Her most noted work is the Black Jewels series. She won the Crawford Award in 2000 for the first three Black Jewels books, sometimes called the Black Jewels trilogy: Daughter of the Blood, Heir to the Shadows, and Queen of the Darkness.

Biography
Born in 1955, Anne Bishop started her writing career by publishing short stories. She is best known for her award-winning novels, The Black Jewels Trilogy, Daughter of the Blood, Heir to the Shadows, and Queen of the Darkness.  Bishop has also created The Tir Alainn Trilogy, and The Landscapes of Ephemera Series. She is currently residing in upstate New York working on The Others, her newest series. Many of her novels are also available internationally.

She lives in upstate New York.

Works

Series
Speculative fiction series constitute most of Bishop's published work.

Black Jewels

The first volume of the original trilogy, and first novel set in the Black Jewels universe, Daughter of the Blood, was published in March 1998. Heir to the Shadows and Queen of the Darkness, published in April 1999 and January 2000, completed the trilogy. An omnibus edition was released in 2003. Also in 2000, Bishop released her first stand alone novel for the Black Jewels universe, The Invisible Ring. Taking place prior to the trilogy itself, readers were able to pick up the novel either before or after reading the trilogy, though Bishop recommends reading it after. In 2005, Bishop then released the book of four short stories known as Dreams Made Flesh. Once again, this collection of short stories allowed a reader to taste the rich universe Bishop had created without needing to have read the core trilogy. Although, reading the trilogy added to the depth of the individual short stories and vice versa. 2008 brought about another stand-alone novel, Tangled Webs. Then in 2009, Bishop's novel The Shadow Queen was published and here she did something a little different. Unlike her prior releases, this novel was related to characters and events which occurred during another of her stand-alone novels, The Invisible Ring as well as the events of the original trilogy. Shalador's Lady, released in 2010, is the sequel to "The Shadow Queen" and in March 2011, Twilight's Dawn hit the shelves. It contains four more short stories which help to answer some questions reader's had about different parts of the universe/story. Two short stories, "By the Time the Witchblood Blooms" and "The Price" were originally published (March 2000 and October 2004 respectively) in anthologies of short stories from a variety of authors. "By the Time the Witchblood Blooms" can also be found at the end of Tangled Webs.

In publication order the titles are: 
Daughter of the Blood, March 1998
Heir to the Shadows, April 1999
Queen of the Darkness, January 2000
 "By the Time the Witchblood Blooms", Treachery and Treason (Anthology), March 2000; in the 2008 collection Tangled Webs, 2008
The Invisible Ring, October 2000 (Prequel)
The Price, (Short Story) Published in Powers of Detection: Tales of Mystery and Fantasy, October 2004
 Dreams Made Flesh, January 2005, collection of four Black Jewels stories:
  "Weaver of Dreams"
  "The Prince of Ebon Rih"
  "Zuulaman"
  "Kaeleer's Heart"
Tangled Webs, March 2008
The Shadow Queen, March 2009 – related to the events/characters of The Invisible Ring and occurring after the original trilogy
Shalador's Lady, March 2010 (Sequel to The Shadow Queen)
 Twilight's Dawn, March 2011, collection of four Black Jewels stories:
  "Winsol Gifts"
  "Shades of Honor"
  "Family"
  "The High Lord's Daughter"
 The Queen's Bargain, March 2020
 The Queen's Weapons, March 2021
 The Queen's Price, March 2023

Tir Alainn
The Pillars of the World, October 2001
Shadows and Light, October 2002
The House of Gaian, October 2003

Ephemera
Sebastian, February 2006
Belladonna, March 2007
The Voice: An Ephemera Novella, February 2012
Bridge of Dreams, March 2012

The Others
Written in Red, March 2013
Murder of Crows, March 2014
Vision in Silver, March 2015
Marked in Flesh, March 2016
Etched In Bone, March 2017
Lake Silence, March 2018
Wild Country, March 2019
Crowbones March 2022

Short stories
 "The Lady in Glass", 2 AM (Fall 1989), September 1989
 "The Weapon", 2 AM (Fall 1991), September 1991
 "Match Girl", Ruby Slippers, Golden Tears (Anthology), December 1995
 "Rapunzel", Black Swan, White Raven (Anthology), June 1997
 "Tunnel", Horrors!  365 Scary Stories, October 1998
 "The Wild Heart", Silver Birch, Blood Moon (Anthology), March 1999
 "A Strand in the Web", Orbiter, September 2002 edited by Julie E. Czerneda
 "By the Time the Witchblood Blooms", Treachery and Treason (Anthology), March 2000; in the 2008 collection Tangled Webs
Summer in Mossy Creek (Collective Novel), June 2003
 "The Fairest One of All", Lighthouse Magazine #2, December 2003
 "The Price", Powers of Detection: Tales of Mystery and Fantasy, October 2004
 "Stands a God Within the Shadows", Imaginary Friends (Anthology), September 2008

References

Citations
 Bishop, Anne. Anne Bishop: The Official Website (annebishop.com). Retrieved July 28, 2014.

External links
 

Anne Bishop Bibliography at Fantastic Fiction
Anne Bishop at Fantasy Literature
 

20th-century American novelists
21st-century American novelists
American fantasy writers
Women science fiction and fantasy writers
American women short story writers
American women novelists
Living people
Date of birth missing (living people)
Place of birth missing (living people)
20th-century American women writers
21st-century American women writers
20th-century American short story writers
21st-century American short story writers
Year of birth missing (living people)